The Men's touch rugby tournament at the 2019 Pacific Games was held in Apia from 15 to 17 July 2019 at the St Joseph's Sports Field.

Participating teams
Seven Pacific Games Associations qualified for this tournament.

  (14)
  (14)
  (14)
  (14) (Host)
  (14)
  (14)
  (14)

Round robin

Day 1

Day 2

Day 3

Semi finals

Playoffs
5th/6th playoff

Bronze medal match

Gold medal match

References

Touch rugby at the 2019 Pacific Games